Chongjin Tram is a public tram system in Chongjin, Democratic People's Republic of Korea (North Korea). The line opened in 1999. There is currently one line in operation.

History

The regular operation on the standard gauge tram line started on 2 July 1999. It was initially six kilometers long and was extended in a later by seven kilometers. Allegedly, according to Choson Sinbo, there were plans to extend the line to Chongjin station with a planned opening date of October 2002, though this is not corroborated elsewhere.

Lines
 Sabong-dong - South Chongjin - Bongchon-dong

Rolling Stock 
Chongjin tram uses a number of locally produced single car trams and a single articulated tram. All vehicles are produced by Chongjin Bus Factory. These single trams bear an extreme resemblance to the Tatra T6B5, but have one more window per side and no resistor equipment on roof. The articulated tram rather appears like a Tatra KT8D5 without the middle section.

See also
Trams and trolleybuses in North Korea
Transport in North Korea
List of tram and light rail transit systems

References

Further reading
Hayato Kokubu, Shōgun-sama no Tetsudō: Kitachōsen Tetsudō Jijō ("Railway of the Dear Leader: The Railway Situation in North Korea"), 2007.

External links
Map of Chongjin Tram
Image of locally produced tram

Chongjin
Tram transport in North Korea
Chongjin